The 1955 Fresno State Bulldogs football team represented Fresno State College—now known as California State University, Fresno—as a member of the California Collegiate Athletic Association (CCAA) during the 1955 college football season. Led by fourth-year head coach Clark Van Galder, Fresno State compiled an overall record of 9–1 with a mark of 2–0 in conference play, placing first in CCAA standings, but no champion was named. The Bulldogs played home games at Ratcliffe Stadium on the campus of Fresno City College in Fresno, California

Schedule

Notes

References

Fresno State
Fresno State Bulldogs football seasons
Fresno State Bulldogs football